Kronprinsessan (English: The Crown Princess) is a Swedish drama series based on Hanne-Vibeke Holst's novel with the same name and aired February–March 2006 by Sveriges Television.

Cast 
Alexandra Rapaport  	–  Charlotte Ekeblad
Ulf Friberg 	–  Thomas Ekeblad
Kenneth Milldoff  	–  Prime Minister Per Viksten
Reine Brynolfsson  	–  Finance Minister Gert Jakobsson
Susanne Reuter  	–  Foreign Minister Elizabeth Meyer
Daniel Götschenhjelm 	–  Jacob Steen
Peter Schildt  	–  Henrik Sand
Morgan Alling	–  Magnus Svensson
Ida Wahlund  	–  Louise Kramer
Sten Elfström  	–  Agriculture Minister Hans Bengtsson
Peter Engman	–  Jesper Anell

Awards

References

External links
 Kronprinsessan at IMDb

2006 Swedish television series debuts
2000s Swedish television series
2006 Swedish television series endings